Let's Pizza is a company, which manufactures pizza making vending machines. The pizzas are prepared from scratch and it is the first vending machine to produce freshly made ready-to-eat pizza.

Information
The machine combines water, flour, tomato sauce, and fresh ingredients to make a pizza in approximately three minutes. It includes windows so customers can watch the pizza as it is made. The pizza is cooked in an infrared oven. The machine is made to create 100 pizzas before it needs to be refilled with its ingredients.

History
The development of the pizza vending machine began in the mid-1990s. Let's Pizza machine cooks pizzas from scratch, which resulted in a working prototype in 2003. The machines were made in Northern Italy. Later that year, test marketing began in Germany. Rollout started in 2009: the machines spread over Europe, and especially through Italy. Let's Pizza entered the South Korean market in 2015.

See also 
 French fry vending machine
 Pancake machine
 Automat

Further reading

References

External links
 

Pizza
Vending machines
Food technology
Manufacturing companies established in 2009